Comoros competed at the 2012 Summer Paralympics in London, United Kingdom from August 29 to September 9, 2012.  Comoros was represented by one swimmer, Hassani Ahamada Djae, who did not qualify for the finals.  He was coached by Soulaimana Bacari.

Swimming

Men

See also

 Comoros at the 2012 Summer Olympics

References

Nations at the 2012 Summer Paralympics
2012
Paralympics